Christ Church is a historic Episcopal church and cemetery located at S. State and Water Streets at Dover, Kent County, Delaware. It is located on one of two public squares set aside for houses of worship in the Dover town plan of 1717. The church was established as a mission church of the Society for the Propagation of the Gospel in 1704 and the building constructed in 1734.  It was remodeled in 1859 and 1887.  It is a brick structure composed of the original rectangular nave, surrounded by brick appendages.  Adjacent to the church is the cemetery, with a number of notable burials. The cemetery includes a cenotaph to a signer of the Declaration of Independence Caesar Rodney; the actual location of Rodney's remains is unknown.

The church was added to the National Register of Historic Places in 1972.  It is located in the Dover Green Historic District.

It is part of the Episcopal Diocese of Delaware, which encompasses the entire state and whose current Bishop is The Right Reverend Kevin Brown.

References

External links

Episcopal church buildings in Delaware
Churches on the National Register of Historic Places in Delaware
Churches completed in 1734
Churches in Kent County, Delaware
18th-century Episcopal church buildings
Historic American Buildings Survey in Delaware
Buildings and structures in Dover, Delaware
Tourist attractions in Dover, Delaware
National Register of Historic Places in Dover, Delaware
Individually listed contributing properties to historic districts on the National Register in Delaware